The 2002 Pepsi 400 presented by Farmer Jack was the 23rd stock car race of the 2002 NASCAR Winston Cup Series and the 33rd iteration of the event. The race was held on Sunday, August 18, 2002, in Brooklyn, Michigan, at Michigan International Speedway, a two-mile (3.2 km) moderate-banked D-shaped speedway. The race took the scheduled 200 laps to complete. At race's end, Dale Jarrett, driving for Robert Yates Racing would make a late-race pass on Jeff Burton to win his 30th career NASCAR Winston Cup Series win and his second and final win of the season. To fill out the podium, Tony Stewart of Joe Gibbs Racing and Kevin Harvick of Richard Childress Racing would finish second and third, respectively.

Background 

The race was held at Michigan International Speedway, a two-mile (3.2 km) moderate-banked D-shaped speedway located in Brooklyn, Michigan. The track is used primarily for NASCAR events. It is known as a "sister track" to Texas World Speedway as MIS's oval design was a direct basis of TWS, with moderate modifications to the banking in the corners, and was used as the basis of Auto Club Speedway. The track is owned by International Speedway Corporation. Michigan International Speedway is recognized as one of motorsports' premier facilities because of its wide racing surface and high banking (by open-wheel standards; the 18-degree banking is modest by stock car standards).

Entry list 

 (R) denotes rookie driver.

Practice

First practice 
The first practice session was held on Friday, August 16, at 3:00 PM EST, and would last for an hour after rain delayed the session.

Second practice 
The second practice session was held on Saturday, August 17, at 10:00 AM EST, and would last for 45 minutes.

Third and final practice 
The third and final practice session, sometimes referred to as Happy Hour, was held on Saturday, July 27, at 11:45 AM EST, and would last for 45 minutes.

Qualifying 
Qualifying was held on Friday, August 16, at 6:00 PM EST after rain delayed qualifying for nearly three hours. Each driver would have two laps to set a fastest time; the fastest of the two would count as their official qualifying lap. Positions 1-36 would be decided on time, while positions 37-43 would be based on provisionals. Six spots are awarded by the use of provisionals based on owner's points. The seventh is awarded to a past champion who has not otherwise qualified for the race. If no past champ needs the provisional, the next team in the owner points will be awarded a provisional.

Greg Biffle would be the only driver to fail to qualify.

Full qualifying results

Race results

References 

2002 NASCAR Winston Cup Series
NASCAR races at Michigan International Speedway
August 2002 sports events in the United States
2002 in sports in Michigan